The George F. Lee Octagon Houses were built by farmer and carpenter George F. Lee south of Nebraska City, Nebraska near the Missouri River.  The first one constructed was a frame octagon house, whose date of construction is unknown; the second, a brick octagon house, was built in 1872 across the road from the first.

On November 23, 1977, they were added to the National Register of Historic Places. Only the wooden house survives.

References

Houses completed in 1856
Houses completed in 1872
Houses on the National Register of Historic Places in Nebraska
Buildings and structures in Nebraska City, Nebraska
Octagon houses in the United States
Houses in Otoe County, Nebraska
National Register of Historic Places in Otoe County, Nebraska